Cyril Dixon (1 February 1901–1978) was an English footballer who played in the Football League for Barnsley and Reading.

References

1901 births
1978 deaths
English footballers
Association football defenders
English Football League players
Barnsley F.C. players
Reading F.C. players
Scarborough F.C. players